"Shut Up" is a song recorded by American hip-hop group the Black Eyed Peas for their third studio album Elephunk (2003). Lyrically, it's about a disastrous courtship with the chorus consisting of the lines "Shut up, just shut up, shut up". The song was released as the second single from Elephunk on September 8, 2003, by A&M Records and Interscope Records.

"Shut Up" was not commercially successful in the United States but became a hit internationally, topping the charts in Australia, New Zealand, and 12 European countries. It was Europe's second biggest hit single of 2004.

Background and release

Group member will.i.am needed a female singer for the song, so he brought in Fergie. She assisted the group on most of the songs on Elephunk and became the group's fourth member in 2003. While will.i.am, apl.de.ap, and Taboo were working on the song, their girlfriends' phone calls would interrupt the session. Will said "The vibe was blown" and Taboo said "So we turned the negative into positive", by adding the problems they were having into the song they were making. "Shut Up" was recorded at The Stewchia in Los Feliz, Los Angeles, from December 30, 2001, to February 19, 2002.

The song's "Knee Deep Remix" includes a rerecorded version of will.i.am's verse and the bridge. It also includes a new verse with apl.de.ap. An edited version of this remix appears on the deluxe version of the group's fifth studio album, The E.N.D, titled "Shut the Phunk Up". The remix samples the song "(Not Just) Knee Deep" by Funkadelic. In December 2010, Funkadelic leader George Clinton filed a copyright infringement lawsuit against will.i.am, Fergie, and Universal Music. Clinton stated that he did not give his permission for the sample and that his signature was forged on the release form.

Chart performance
"Shut Up" became an international success, reaching number one in Australia, Austria, Belgium (Flanders and Wallonia), the Czech Republic, France, Germany, Ireland, Italy, New Zealand, Norway, Romania, Sweden, and Switzerland. The single also reached number two in Denmark, the Netherlands, and the United Kingdom and peaked at number five in Hungary. At the end of 2004, it was ranked as Europe's second-highest-selling single according to the Eurochart Hot 100, on which the song peaked at number one. As of August 2014, it was the 47th best-selling single of the 21st century in France, with 400,000 units sold.

In Germany, it is the second-best-selling single of the band behind "I Gotta Feeling", selling 300,000 copies to reach platinum status. The song peaked at number one on the German Singles Chart and stayed there for five weeks, becoming the band's longest run at the pole position. In the United States, the song never charted on the Billboard Hot 100 despite appearing at number 30 on the Billboard Mainstream Top 40 in November 2003.

Music video
The music video was directed by The Malloys and features an opera themed around a battle of the sexes. In it, will.i.am and Taboo play Fergie's suitors, and apl.de.ap is the conductor.

The music video has several Andre the Giant Has a Posse-style posters near the stage man. Two posters from the song "Where Is the Love?" are also shown. Kimberly Wyatt and Carmit Bachar from the Pussycat Dolls both make cameos in the video. Travis Barker from Blink 182, Shifty Shellshock from Crazy Town and French singer Afida Turner also have a cameo in the video.

Track listings

US 12-inch vinyl 
A1. "Shut Up" (LP) – 5:10
A2. "Shut Up" (radio edit) – 3:46
A3. "Shut Up" (instrumental) – 5:09
A4. "Shut Up" (acapella) – 4:55
B1. "Shut Up" (Knee Deep Remix) – 4:23
B2. "Shut Up" (Knee Deep Remix instrumental) – 4:21
B3. "Shut Up" (Knee Deep Remix acapella) – 4:20

European CD single 
 "Shut Up" – 5:12
 "Tell Your Mama Come" (live from House of Blues, Chicago) – 2:51

UK and Australian CD single 
 "Shut Up" – 5:12
 "Tell Your Mama Come" (live from the House of Blues, Chicago) – 2:52
 "Karma" (live from the House of Blues, Chicago) – 3:05
 "Shut Up" (video)

UK 12-inch single 
A1. "Shut Up"
B1. "Tell Your Mama Come" (live from the House of Blues, Chicago)
B2. "Karma" (live from the House of Blues, Chicago)

Personnel

The Black Eyed Peas
 will.i.am – vocals, Moog synthesizer, executive production, production
 Fergie – vocals
 Taboo – vocals
 apl.de.ap – vocals (Knee Deep/E.N.D. remix only)

Additional musicians
 George Pajon, Jr. – guitar
 J. Curtis – guitar
 Ray Brady – guitar

Production personnel
 Ron Fair – executive production, additional vocal production
 Dylan Dresdow – engineering
 Christine Sirois – engineering assistance
 Tony Maserati – mixing
 Brian Gardner – mastering
 Tal Herzberg – additional engineering

Charts

Weekly charts

Year-end charts

Decade-end charts

Certifications

Release history

See also

 List of number-one singles in Australia in 2003
 List of number-one hits of 2003 (Germany)
 List of European number-one hits of 2003
 List of number-one singles of 2003 (Ireland)
 List of number-one hits of 2003 (Switzerland)
 Ultratop 50 number-one hits of 2003
 List of number-one hits of 2004 (Austria)
 List of number-one hits of 2004 (France)
 List of number-one hits of 2004 (Italy)
 List of number-one singles from the 2000s (New Zealand)
 List of number-one hits in Norway
 List of Romanian Top 100 number ones of the 2000s
 List of number-one hits (Sweden)
 Ultratop 40 number-one hits of 2004

References

2003 singles
2003 songs
A&M Records singles
Black Eyed Peas songs
Dutch Top 40 number-one singles
European Hot 100 Singles number-one singles
Interscope Records singles
Irish Singles Chart number-one singles
Music videos directed by The Malloys
Number-one singles in Australia
Number-one singles in Austria
Number-one singles in the Czech Republic
Number-one singles in Germany
Number-one singles in Italy
Number-one singles in New Zealand
Number-one singles in Norway
Number-one singles in Poland
Number-one singles in Romania
Number-one singles in Sweden
Number-one singles in Switzerland
SNEP Top Singles number-one singles
Song recordings produced by will.i.am
Songs involved in plagiarism controversies
Songs written by Taboo (rapper)
Songs written by will.i.am
Ultratop 50 Singles (Flanders) number-one singles
Ultratop 50 Singles (Wallonia) number-one singles